The Opposite House is a novel by British author Helen Oyeyemi first published by Bloomsbury Press in 2007.

Plot
Maja Carmen Carrera, the British daughter of scholarly Cuban immigrants struggles with faith as she awaits the birth of her first child.

References

2007 British novels
Bloomsbury Publishing books
Novels by Helen Oyeyemi